Lai Sun Group is a Hong Kong conglomerate. It was founded by garment billionaire and entrepreneur, Lim Por-yen. Its businesses include property development, real estate investment, hotel, telecom, mass media and entertainment. Lai Sun is working with Major League Gaming to build an esports arena on Hengqin.

Lai Sun Group is developing Novotown at Hengqin, Zhuhai, China. It is an integrated tourism and entertainment project. Phase one has been completed, and features two indoor attractions Lionsgate Entertainment World and National Geographic Ultimate Explorer. It also includes the 494-room Hengqin Hyatt Regency Hotel and mixed-use shopping centre with a host of restaurants and bars. Phase one costs about 5 billion yuan (HK$6.16 billion). Phase 2 will include an interactive football experience centre and automobile experience centre in partnership with Real Madrid football club and Porsche respectively.

The group consists of several companies and some of them are listed on the Hong Kong Stock Exchange.
 Crocodile Garments
 Lai Sun Garment (International) Limited
 Lai Fung Holdings Limited
 Lai Sun Development Company Limited
 eSun Holdings Limited (0571.HK)

References

External links

 Lai Sun Group

 
Conglomerate companies of China
Conglomerate companies of Hong Kong
Companies listed on the Hong Kong Stock Exchange